Sergei Borisovich Krylov (13 January 1888 – 24 November 1958) was a Soviet diplomat and one of the authors of the UN Charter. He served as a judge of the International Court of Justice from its beginning in 1946 until 1952. He taught at the Moscow State Institute of International Relations.

1888 births
1958 deaths
Lawyers from Saint Petersburg
Communist Party of the Soviet Union members
Academic staff of the Diplomatic Academy of the Ministry of Foreign Affairs of the Russian Federation
Academic staff of the Moscow State Institute of International Relations
Academic staff of Saint Petersburg State University
Recipients of the Order of the Red Banner of Labour
International Court of Justice judges
International Law Commission officials
International law scholars
Soviet judges of United Nations courts and tribunals
Soviet jurists